This is the discography of American R&B/soul vocal group The Chi-Lites.

Albums

Studio albums

Compilation albums

Singles

Notes

References

Rhythm and blues discographies
Discographies of American artists